Tokur may refer to:

 Tokur, India, a village in India
 Tokur, Russia, an urban-type settlement in Amur Oblast, Russia
 A breed of pigeon — see List of pigeon breeds